Philippa de Stafford, Countess of Stafford (before 1344 – 6 April 1386), was a late medieval English noblewoman and the daughter of Thomas de Beauchamp, 11th Earl of Warwick, KG, and Katherine Mortimer. Her maternal grandfather was the powerful Roger Mortimer, 1st Earl of March.

Marriage and issue
On or before 1 March 1350, she married Hugh de Stafford, 2nd Earl of Stafford, son of Ralph de Stafford, 1st Earl of Stafford, and Margaret de Audley, suo jure 2nd Baroness Audley. 

Together Hugh and Philippa had at least seven children:

Margaret Stafford (c. 1364 – 9 June 1396). Married Ralph Neville, 1st Earl of Westmorland as his first wife and had issue.
Sir Ralph Stafford (c. 1367 – July 1385). Killed by King Richard II's half-brother, John Holland, 1st Duke of Exeter in a feud during an expedition against the Scots in July 1385.
Thomas Stafford, 3rd Earl of Stafford (c. 1368 – 4 July 1392). Inherited the earldom from his father at the age of 18. Married Anne Plantagenet, daughter of Thomas of Woodstock, 1st Duke of Gloucester and Eleanor de Bohun. No issue, the marriage was reportedly never consummated.
William Stafford, 4th Earl of Stafford (21 September 1375 – 6 April 1395). Inherited the earldom from his brother at the age of 14.  He was a ward of Thomas of Woodstock, 1st Duke of Gloucester. He died at 19.
Katherine Stafford (c. 1376 – 8 April 1419). Married Michael de la Pole, 2nd Earl of Suffolk and had issue.
Edmund Stafford, 5th Earl of Stafford (2 March 1377 – 22 July 1403). Inherited the earldom from his brother at the age of 17. Married Anne of Gloucester, widow of his elder brother Thomas. Edmund and Anne were the parents of Humphrey Stafford, 1st Duke of Buckingham.
Joan Stafford (1378 – 1 October 1442). Married Thomas Holland, 1st Duke of Surrey and 3rd Earl of Kent. No issue.

Death
The Countess Philippa died in spring 1386, and it was probably this combined with the death of their eldest son that pushed her husband to undertake a series of pilgrimages. She was buried at Stone Priory, Staffordshire. The Earl died in October of the same year in Rhodes, having not yet reached his destination of Jerusalem.

Ancestors

References

Sources
 Richard Glanville-Brown, correspondence, Richard Glanville-Brown (RR 2, Milton, Ontario, Canada), 17 August 2005.
 G.E. Cokayne; with Vicary Gibbs, H.A. Doubleday, Geoffrey H. White, Duncan Warrand and Lord Howard de Walden, editors, The Complete Peerage of England, Scotland, Ireland, Great Britain and the United Kingdom, Extant, Extinct or Dormant. new ed., 13 volumes in 14 (1910–1959; reprint in 6 volumes, Gloucester, U.K.: Alan Sutton Publishing, 2000), volume XII/2, page 547.
 Charles Mosley, editor, Burke's Peerage and Baronetage. 106th edition, 2 vols.,  Crans, Switzerland: Burke's Peerage (Genealogical Books) Ltd, 1999 

14th-century births
1386 deaths
Daughters of British earls
14th-century English women
14th-century English people
Stafford
Wives of knights